State Route 140 (SR 140) is part of Maine's system of numbered state highways, located in Oxford and Franklin counties. The southern terminus of the route is in Buckfield, at the intersection with SR 117. The northern terminus of the route is in Jay, at the intersections with SR 4 and SR 17.

Junction list

References

External links

Floodgap Roadgap's RoadsAroundME: Maine State Route 140

140
Transportation in Oxford County, Maine
Transportation in Franklin County, Maine